The Grammy Award for Best Large Jazz Ensemble Album has been presented since 1961.  From 1962 to 1971 and 1979 to 1991 the award title specified instrumental performances. Years reflect the year in which the Grammy Awards were presented, for works released in the previous year.

Name changes
The name of the award has been changed several times.
 1961: Best Jazz Performance Large Group
 1962–1963: Best Jazz Performance – Large Group (Instrumental)
 1964: Best Instrumental Jazz Performance – Large Group
 1965–1971: Best Instrumental Jazz Performance – Large Group or Soloist with Large Group
 1972–1978: Best Jazz Performance by a Big Band
 1979–1991: Best Jazz Instrumental Performance, Big Band
 1992–2000: Best Large Jazz Ensemble Performance
 2001–present: Best Large Jazz Ensemble Album

Recipients

See also
 Grammy Award for Best Jazz Instrumental Album
 Grammy Award for Best Improvised Jazz Solo
 Grammy Award for Best Jazz Vocal Album

References

Sources
Grammy Awards – Past Winners SearchAs noted in this article: search years are offset by one year.

 
Album awards